The 2010–11 season is the 78th season of competitive professional football in France. The league season began on 6 August 2010 for the Championnat National and Ligue 2 and on 7 August for Ligue 1 and the Championnat de France amateur. The season concluded on 26 May 2011 for Ligue 2, 27 May for the Championnat National, and 28 May for Ligue 1 and the Championnat de France amateur. The men's French national team began play on 11 August contesting a friendly match against Norway, while the women continued their quest for qualification to the 2011 FIFA Women's World Cup by facing Iceland on 21 August.

News

Television deals
On 1 April 2010, the LFP announced that the league had reached a broadcasting agreement with Italian channel Sportitalia. The channel will broadcast Ligue 1 games for the next two seasons beginning with the 2010–11 season. Sportitalia will show one or two live matches a week and will also air a weekly highlights show. A similar deal was reached a week later with Hong Kong telecommunications company PCCW who will broadcast Ligue 1 matches in the country for the next two seasons. On 7 May, the president of the Ligue de Football Professionnel, Frédéric Thiriez, announced that the organization had reached a two-year deal with Eurosport to broadcast Ligue 2 matches. The deal is worth €10 million a year and guarantees the channel broadcasting rights to the annual Monday night Ligue 2 match.

Le Classique in Tunisia
On 2 April, the LFP announced that, for the second consecutive season, the Trophée des champions will be held on international soil. The match will be played in Tunis, Tunisia, at the Stade 7 Novembre and will be contested by the winner of Ligue 1, Olympique de Marseille and the winner of the Coupe de France, Paris Saint-Germain. The match will be played on either Tuesday, 27 July, or Friday, 30 July. Like last year, the idea will be to promote French football abroad, but this time more specifically in Africa and the Arab world.

New channel in 2012
On 7 May 2010, the president of the Ligue de Football Professionnel, Frédéric Thiriez, confirmed that the organization was interested in creating its own television channel for the  broadcasting Ligue 1 and Ligue 2 matches. Thiriez referred to the channel as "an investment for the future" and that the channel will not come to fruition until the conclusion of the organization's television deals with pay channels Canal+, Orange and SFR, which expires in 2012.

Artificial pitch switch
On 17 May 2010, the Ligue de Football Professionnel announced that, for the first time in French football history, two clubs, Lorient and Nancy, will switch the surface of their football pitch from grass to artificial turf. This type of surface is common in North America and Eastern Europe, but is considered rare in Western Europe. Both clubs attributed the switch to weather and ecological problems with severe cold fronts affecting their region every winter. The switch would, in turn, reduce energy costs and also avoid cancellations of matches due to a frozen pitch. Also, in Lorient's case, a constant proliferation of earthworms onto their pitch over the past two seasons have led to a rapid deterioration of the ground, which has forced the club to spend as much as €2 million to replace it. Both clubs will have pre-season tours of Russia, Austria, and Norway to become better acclimated with the surface.

New national team manager
On 16 May 2010, Laurent Blanc confirmed his departure from Bordeaux after three seasons in charge of the French outfit. After resigning from his position, Blanc contacted the French Football Federation (FFF) to inquire about the France national team job, which will be vacated by Raymond Domenech following the 2010 FIFA World Cup. Later that day, FFF president Jean-Pierre Escalettes confirmed that Blanc was a candidate for the position. On 18 May 2010, with Blanc's appointment to the position becoming more probable, Bordeaux chairman Jean-Louis Triaud demanded compensation from the FFF. On 20 May 2010, the club reached an agreement with the Federation for €1.5 million. Blanc will not be named the coach of the team until the end of the World Cup.

Evian stadium move
After earning promotion to Ligue 2 for the 2010–11 season, Evian were rumored to be pursuing a move to play their home matches at the Stade de la Praille in Geneva, Switzerland, after it was determined that their current facility, the Stade Joseph-Moynat, did not meet the Ligue de Football Professionnel (LFP)'s standards. Thonon-les-Bains, the commune where the club situates itself, is a few kilometers from the Swiss border and is only , a 45-minute car drive, from the city of Geneva. It was reported that the club's president, Patrick Trotignon, had been in the process of advocating for the move since the beginning of the 2009–10 Championnat National season just in case the club had achieved promotion to the second division. The vice-president of Swiss club Servette FC, who occupy the stadium, questioned the move, citing possible schedule conflicts as well as the health of the pitch if both clubs were to use the stadium on a weekly basis. His claims, however, were refuted by Benoît Genecand, who serves as president of Fondation du Stade de Genève (FSG), which owns and operates the facility. The club responded immediately to Genecand's comments via a press release posted on the club's official website.

Evian petitioned to the State Council of Geneva and obtained approval from the LFP for the move in early May. On 20 May 2010, Evian received a favorable ruling from the FFF with the Federal Council voting in favor of the move. According to the FFF, the move now had to be agreed upon by a UEFA executive committee, which is composed of 17 officials. On 8 June, UEFA officially denied Evian's request to play at the Stade de la Praille, meaning the club will likely play its home matches at the Parc des Sports in nearby Annecy.

Five referee system for cup
On 20 August 2010, the LFP confirmed that the Coupe de la Ligue would utilized the five-referee system that is currently being used in the UEFA Champions League and the UEFA Europa League. The announcement makes the Coupe de la Ligue the first national cup competition in Europe to adopt the system and was approved by the International Football Association Board (IFAB) on 21 July. The system officially began on 24 August with the start of the second round matches and will be in place until the final in April 2011.

DNCG rulings

National
On 15 June 2010, following a study of each club's administrative and financial accounts in the Championnat National, the DNCG ruled that both Bastia and Gueugnon would be relegated to the Championnat de France amateur, while Amiens, Guingamp and Strasbourg were having their accounts subjected to further deliberation in order to determine whether each club could retain its professional status. Both Bastia and Gueugnon had the option to appeal the decision. On 25 June 2010, the Corsican Assembly and the General Council of Haute-Corse approved grants of €800,000 and €150,000 to be given to Bastia in order for the club to meet the DNCG's financial requirements, which will allow the club to remain in the Championnat National. On 6 July, however, the DNCG remained firm on its stance relegating the club to the fourth division after questioning the legitimacy of the grants. Bastia president Julien Lolli remained confident that the club would play in the Championnat National and formerly made an appeal to the CNOSF, the National Sporting Committee of France, the same day. On 2 July, the DNCG announced that Gueugnon would remain in National after the club successfully appealed to the organization. On 16 July, the CNOSF ruled against the DNCG and announced that Bastia should play in the Championnat National. The club's place in the league was confirmed upon the release of the league table.

On 2 July, local media in Alsace reported that Strasbourg were on the verge of being relegated to the Championnat de France amateur by the DNCG due to financial issues. The club responded by announcing its willingness to appeal if the news reported was confirmed. With the club's accounts still being reviewed, Strasbourg's financial issues were slightly alleviated after the sale of striker Magaye Gueye to English club Everton for €1.4 million. Strasbourg later transferred captain Guillaume Lacour and Algerian international Yacine Bezzaz to Evian and Troyes, respectively, for nominal fees. On 16 July, the report was confirmed when the DNCG officially relegated Strasbourg to the CFA. Strasbourg will appeal the decision next week.

CFA
On 15 June 2010, following a study of each club's administrative and financial accounts in the Championnat de France amateur, the DNCG ruled that Besançon RC, Hyères FC, CS Louhans-Cuiseaux, FC Montceau Bourgogne, EDS Montluçon, Olympique Noisy-le-Sec, and RCF Paris would be relegated to the Championnat de France amateur 2. The organization also ruled that newly promoted club Calais RUFC would be excluded from ascending up to the fourth division, while SO Cassis Carnoux, which had been relegated from the Championnat National, would also be excluded from the league. The second place club in Calais' group, CMS Oissel, who was set to replace Calais was also denied promotion to the Championnat de France amateur. All clubs had the option to appeal the decision.

On 7 July, Besançon, Hyères, and Oissel's appeals were heard by the DNCG Appeals Committee and, following deliberation and explanations from each club, the committee ruled in favor of Besançon, but upheld the appeals of Hyères and Oissel. The following day, the appeals committee granted both Louhans-Cuiseaux and Noisy-le-Sec appeals to stay in the fourth division. The committee, however, upheld the rulings of Calais, Montceau Bourgogne, Montluçon, and Racing Paris.

Referee suspension 
On 5 March 2011, the FFF confirmed through an official statement on its website that referees who were scheduled to officiate the 5–6 March matches would be barred from officiating them after it was revealed that the referees, who are all members of the Syndicat des Arbitres de Football Elite (SAFE), the referee's union, would purposely delay the start time of matches in response the overall "profound disrespect for referees from everyone involved in football". On its official website, the FFF regretted SAFE's decision and also accused the group of attempted blackmail. The referees were replaced by their counterparts in the Championnat National, the third level of French football, for the week.

Under-17 team record win 
On 30 March 2011, the national under-17 team of France recorded a 9–0 win over Belarus in the Elite Round qualification for the 2011 UEFA European Under-17 Football Championship. The result is the biggest victory ever in Elite Round qualification history. The goals were scored by Paris Saint-Germain midfielder Abdallah Yaisien, who scored four; Caen striker Lenny Nangis, who scored a hat trick; Sébastien Haller of Auxerre, who converted a stoppage time penalty; and Athletic Bilbao defender Aymeric Laporte, who scored a first-half goal. The victory progressed the team to the final tournament.

Investigation into alleged quota 
On 28 April 2011, French investigative website Mediapart released a story which claimed that the FFF had been attempting to secretly put in place a race-quota system in order to limit the number of black and Arab players in its national academies. Quoting a senior figure in the FFF, the organisation was said to have wanted to set a cap of 30% on the number of players of non-white origin by limiting places in the academies in the 12–13 age bracket. The FFF responded by releasing a public statement on its website denying the report stating "none of its elected bodies has been validated, or even contemplated a policy of quotas for the recruitment of its training centers". The FFF also announced that it has authorized a full investigation into the matter and, as a result, suspended National Technical Director François Blaquart pending the outcome of the investigation.

On 29 April, national team manager Laurent Blanc, who, in the report, was claimed to have agreed with the decision to implement the quotas, held a personal press conference at the l'Hôtel Le Régent in Bordeaux, in which he also denied the report declaring that he had "not heard of such a project". On the following day, after Mediapart announced that it had a taped audio recording of the November 2010 meeting, Blanc released a statement on the FFF's website in which he apologized for possible offending comments he made during the meeting, while also declaring he was misquoted and denying he was racist, stating, "I do not withdraw the remarks I made yesterday. I admit that some terms used during a meeting on a sensitive subject can be ambiguous, out of context, and, if in my case, I've hurt some feelings, I apologize. But being suspected of racism or xenophobia, which I am against all forms of discrimination, I do not support it."

Former national team player Lilian Thuram said of the allegations, "Initially I thought this was a joke. I'm so stunned I don't know what to say," while Patrick Vieira declared that the comments Blanc allegedly made at the meeting made were "serious and scandalous". The French government also gave opinions on the matter. President Nicolas Sarkozy was quoted as being "viscerally opposed to any form of quota", while adding "setting quotas would be the end of the Republic". National Sports Minister Chantal Jouanno echoed the President's sentiments, while also demanding that the FFF "shed light" on a report. Blanc was defended by several former players, most notably his 1998 World Cup-winning teammates Christophe Dugarry, Bixente Lizarazu, Didier Deschamps, Zinedine Zidane, Marcel Desailly and Emmanuel Petit, current players such as current national team captain Alou Diarra, and external sources, which included Pathé Diba, the president of L'Association Soutien aux Handicapés Africains. On 9 May, Blanc gave testimony at a hearing set up by the FFF to investigate the quota matter. The results of the inquiry will be revealed on 10 May.

Promotion and relegation
Teams promoted to Ligue 1
 Caen
 Brest
 Arles-Avignon

Teams relegated to Ligue 2
 Le Mans
 Boulogne
 Grenoble

Teams promoted to Ligue 2
 Evian
 Reims
 Troyes

Teams relegated to Championnat National
 Guingamp
 Strasbourg
 Bastia

Teams promoted to Championnat National
 Colmar
 Gap
 Niort
 Orléans
 Alfortville

Teams relegated to Championnat de France amateur
 Moulins
 Hyères
 Cassis Carnoux
 Louhans-Cuiseaux

Promoted to Championnat de France amateur
 Aubervilliers
 Avion
 Béziers
 Calais
 Lorient Reserves
 Metz Reserves
 Monaco Reserves
 Monts d'Or Azergues
 Le Poiré-sur-Vie
 Saint-Étienne Reserves
 Saint-Pryvé Saint-Hilaire
 Uzès Pont du Gard

Teams relegated to Championnat de France amateur 2
 Balma
 Bordeaux Reserves
 Dunkerque
 Grenoble Reserves
 Le Pontet
 Mantes
 Marck
 Montpellier Reserves
 Pontivy
 Quimper
 Strasbourg Reserves
 Toulouse Fontaines
 Vesoul Haute-Saône

Teams promoted to Championnat de France amateur 2
 Bonchamp
 Borgo
 Brive
 Chambly
 Chartres
 Dinan-Léhon
 Forbach
 Grand-Synthe
 Granville
 Jura Dolois
 La Châtaigneraie
 Lannion
 Le Puy
 Lormont
 Paris B
 Prix-les-Mézières
 Revel
 Saint Marcel
 Sablé-sur-Sarthe
 Schiltigheim
 Toulon-Le Las
 Vierzon

Managerial changes

Ligue 1

In-season

Ligue 2

In-season

Championnat National

In-season

Transfers

Competitions

International competitions

Men's

Women's

National teams

France
Friendly

UEFA Euro 2012 qualification

Friendly

UEFA Euro 2012 qualification

Friendly

UEFA Euro 2012 qualification

Friendly

Last updated: 15 June 2011Source: French Football Federation

France (women's)
2011 FIFA Women's World Cup qualification

2011 FIFA Women's World Cup playoff qualification

Friendly

Cyprus Cup

Friendly

2011 FIFA Women's World Cup

Last updated: 16 July 2011Source: French Football Federation

France U-21
2011 UEFA European Under-21 Football Championship qualification

Friendly

Last updated: 5 June 2011Source: French Football Federation

France U-20
Friendly

Unofficial Friendly

Friendly

Unofficial Friendly

Friendly

2011 Toulon Tournament

Unofficial Friendly

Friendly

2011 FIFA U-20 World Cup

Last updated: 20 August 2011Source: French Football Federation

France U-19
2010 Sendai Cup

2011 UEFA European Under-19 Football Championship qualification

Friendly

Porto Tournament

2011 UEFA European Under-19 Football Championship Elite Round qualification

Last updated: 25 May 2011Source: French Football Federation

France U-18
Friendly

Tournio de Limoges

Winter Tournament

Friendly

Friendly

Friendly

Last updated: 12 May 2011Source: French Football Federation

France U-17
Serbia Tournament

Friendly

2011 UEFA European Under-17 Football Championship qualification

2011 UEFA European Under-17 Football Championship Elite Round qualification

Friendly

2011 UEFA European Under-17 Football Championship

Friendly

2011 FIFA U-17 World Cup

Last updated: 4 July 2011Source: French Football Federation

France U-16
Friendly

Tournio du Val-de-Marne

Friendly

2011 Aegean Cup

Friendly

2011 Montaigu Tournament

Friendly

Last updated: 25 May 2011Source: French Football Federation

Notes

References

External links
 Official FFF site

 
Seasons in French football